The 13th annual Venice International Film Festival was held from 20 August to 12 September 1952.

Jury 
 Mario Gromo (head of jury)
 Filippo Sacchi
 Enrico Falqui
 Giuseppe Ungaretti
 Pericle Fazzini
 Enzo Masetti
 Sandro De Feo
 Carlo Trabucco

In Competition

Awards
Golden Lion of Saint Mark
 Best Film - Forbidden Games (René Clément)
Special Jury Prize
The Curious Adventures of Mr. Wonderbird (Paul Grimault) 
Mandy (Alexander Mackendrick)
Volpi Cup
Best Actor - Fredric March (Death of a Salesman) 
Best Actress - Ingrid Bergman (Europe '51)
Golden Osella
Best Original Screenplay - Phone Call from a Stranger (Nunnally Johnson) 
Best Original Music - La Putain respectueuse (Georges Auric)
Best Production Design - The Importance of Being Earnest (Carmen Dillon)
International Award
Europe '51 (Roberto Rossellini)
The Quiet Man (John Ford)
The Life of Oharu (Kenji Mizoguchi)
FIPRESCI Prize
Beauties of the Night (René Clair) 
OCIC Award
The Quiet Man (John Ford)
Pasinetti Award
The Quiet Man (John Ford)

References

External links
 
 Venice Film Festival 1952 Awards on IMDb

1952 film festivals
1952 in Italy
Venice Film Festival
Film
August 1952 events in Europe
September 1952 events in Europe